Holpert is a surname. Notable people with the surname include:

Ervin Holpert (born 1986), Serbian sprint canoeist
Jan Holpert (born 1962), German handball player
Jožef Holpert (born 1961), Yugoslav handball player

See also
Halpert